The Streets of Ankh-Morpork is a map and brief guide of the fictional city of Ankh-Morpork in Discworld, a fantasy series by English author Terry Pratchett. The final, artwork-grade map was drawn by Stephen Player, who also drew the artwork for a later publication, The Discworld Mapp.

References

External links
 

Discworld books
Fictional atlases
Fictional maps
Maps of cities
Discworld locations
Corgi books
1993 books